Globočec Ludbreški  is a village in Croatia. It is connected by the D2 highway.

Notable people
Antun Blažić - Croatian Partisan and People's Hero of Yugoslavia

References

Populated places in Varaždin County